The Dutch Waterline (modern spelling: Hollandse Waterlinie) was a series of water-based defences conceived by Maurice of Nassau in the early 17th century, and realised by his half brother Frederick Henry. Combined with natural bodies of water, the Waterline could be used to transform Holland, the westernmost region of the Netherlands and adjacent to the North Sea, almost into an island. In the 19th century, the Line was extended to include Utrecht.

On July 26, 2021, the line was added to the Defence Line of Amsterdam to become the Dutch Water Defence Lines UNESCO World Heritage Site.

History
Early in the Eighty Years' War of Independence against Spain, the Dutch realized that flooding low-lying areas formed an excellent defence against enemy troops. This was demonstrated, for example, during the Siege of Leiden in 1574. In the latter half of the war, when the province of Holland had been freed of Spanish troops, Maurice of Nassau planned to defend it with a line of flooded land protected by fortresses that ran from the Zuiderzee (present IJsselmeer) down to the river Waal.

Old Dutch Waterline

In 1629, Prince Frederick Henry started the execution of the plan. Sluices were constructed in dikes and forts and fortified towns were created at strategic points along the line with guns covering the dikes that traversed the water line. The water level in the flooded areas was carefully maintained at a level deep enough to make an advance on foot precarious and shallow enough to rule out effective use of boats (other than the flat bottomed gun barges used by the Dutch defenders). Under the water level additional obstacles like ditches and trous de loup (and much later, barbed wire and land mines) were hidden. The trees lining the dikes that formed the only roads through the line could be turned into abatis in time of war. In wintertime the water level could be manipulated to weaken ice covering, while the ice itself could be used when broken up to form further obstacles that would expose advancing troops to fire from the defenders for longer.

The Dutch Water Line proved its value less than forty years after its construction during the Franco-Dutch War (or Third Anglo-Dutch War) (1672), when it stopped the armies of Louis XIV from conquering Holland, although the freezing over of the line came close to rendering it useless. In 1794 and 1795, the revolutionary French armies overcame the obstacle posed by the Dutch Water Line only by the heavy frost that had frozen the flooded areas solid.

New Dutch Waterline

After the final defeat of Napoleon in 1815 at the Battle of Waterloo, the United Kingdom of the Netherlands was formed. Soon after King William I decided to modernise the Water Line. The Water Line was partly shifted east of Utrecht.

In the next 100 years the main Dutch defence line would be the new Water Line. It was further extended and modernised in the 19th century, with forts containing round gun towers reminiscent of Martello towers. The line was mobilised but never attacked during the Franco-Prussian war in 1870 and World War I.

At the advent of World War II, most of the earth and brick fortifications in the Water Line were too vulnerable to modern artillery and bombs to withstand a protracted siege. To remedy this a large number of pillboxes were added. However, the Dutch had decided to use a more eastern main defence line, the Grebbe Line, and reserved a secondary role for the Water Line.

When the Grebbe Line was broken on May 13, the field army was withdrawn to the Water Line. However, modern tactics could circumvent fixed defense lines, as happened during the French Maginot Line. While the Dutch army was fighting a fixed battle at the Grebbe Line, German airborne troops captured the southern approaches into the heart of "Fortress Holland" by surprise, the key points being the bridges at Moerdijk, Dordrecht and Rotterdam. When resistance did not cease, the Germans forced the Dutch into surrender by aerial bombing of Rotterdam and threatening the same for Utrecht and Amsterdam.

From its conception in 1815, until the last modernisation in 1940, the equivalent of around 50 billion euro was spent on the New Dutch Water Line.

After World War II, the Dutch government redesigned the idea of a waterline to counter a possible Soviet invasion. This third version of the Water Line was erected more to the east at the IJssel (the IJssel Line) and in Gelderland. In case of an invasion, the water of the Rhine and the Waal were set to divert into the IJssel, flooding the river and bordering lands. The plan was never tested, and it was dismantled by the Dutch government in 1964.

Dimensions and units

At present

Today many of the forts are still more or less intact. There is renewed interest in the waterline for its natural beauty. Bike tours and hiking paths are organised with the line as a theme. Some of the forts are open for bikers/hikers to stay the night. Others have a variety of uses, for example Utrecht University houses its botanical garden in Fort Hoofddijk.

Due to the unique nature of the line, the Dutch government considered whether to nominate the whole defensive line as a UNESCO World Heritage Site, as they did with the ring of fortresses around Amsterdam. On July 26, 2021, the line was added as a UNESCO World Heritage Site.

A 25-year plan has been developed by the artist, Agnes Denes.

In 2010, one of the forts on the Line Bunker 599, was opened as a publicly accessible work of art.  The bunker was sliced open, with a walkway placed through it forming an installation allowing a view to look into and through the bunker.

Forts and fortified towns on the New Waterline
To protect weaknesses in the waterline a series of forts and fortified towns have been constructed. 

Order of forts following the line from north to south.

Forts explicitly built to defend a town are mentioned with the relevant town in  parentheses
Permanent battery De Westbatterij (Muiden)
Castle Muiderslot (Muiden)
Fortified town of Muiden
Fortified town of Weesp
Fort aan de Ossenmarkt (Weesp)
Fort Uitermeer
Fort Hinderdam
Fort Ronduit (Naarden)
Fortified town of Naarden
Permanent batteries at the Karnemelksloot (Naarden)
Fort Uitermeer
Fort Kijkuit
Fort Spion
Fort Nieuwersluis
Fort bij Tienhoven
Fort aan de Klop (Utrecht)
Fort de Gagel (Utrecht)
Fort op de Ruigenhoeksedijk (Utrecht)
Fort Blauwkapel (Utrecht)
Fort op de Voordorpsdijk (Utrecht)
Fort aan de Biltstraat (Utrecht)
Minor fort Werk aan de Hoofddijk (Utrecht)
Fort bij Rhijnauwen (Utrecht)
Lunetten, a series of small crescent-shaped forts:
Lunet I (Utrecht)
Lunet II (Utrecht)
Lunet III (Utrecht)
Lunet IV (Utrecht)
Fort bij Vechten (Utrecht)
Fort bij 't Hemeltje
Fort bij Jutphaas (Nieuwegein)
Minor fort Werk aan de Waalse Wetering
Minor fort Werk aan de Korte Uitweg
Lunet aan de Snel
Fort Honswijk
Minor fort Werk aan de Groeneweg
Fort Everdingen
Minor fort Werk aan het Spoel
Fort Pannerden
Fort Boven Lent
Minor fort Werk op de spoorweg bij de Diefdijk
Fort bij Asperen
Fort bij de Nieuwe Steeg
Fort bij Vuren
Fortified town of Gorinchem
Fortified town of Woudrichem
Castle Loevestein
Minor fort Werk aan de Bakkerskil
Fort Steurgat
Fort aan de Uppelse Dijk (Fort Altena)
Fort Giessen

See also

Dutch waterlines
Defence Line of Amsterdam
Frisian waterline
Grebbe line
IJssel Line
Maas Line
Peel-Raam Line
West Brabant waterline

Other
Defence lines of the Netherlands
Crossing the Lines
List of fortifications

Notes

References
 Wandelplatform-LAW. Waterliniepad (in Dutch) 1st edition, 2004. 
 Klinkert, W., Het Vaderland Verdedigt (in Dutch) 1st edition, 1992,

External links

New Dutch Waterline - official site (in English; Dutch, German, French also available)
Dutch Water Defence Lines UNESCO collection on Google Arts and Culture
Nieuwe Hollandse Waterlinie - Knowledge database for the Dutch Waterline (in Dutch)
Site about the war in May 1940 in the Netherlands (in English)

Fortifications in the Netherlands
Military history of the Netherlands
World War II defensive lines
World War II sites in the Netherlands
History of North Brabant
History of North Holland
History of South Holland
History of Utrecht (province)
Buildings and structures in Utrecht (city)